Martin Jensen is a sound engineer. He was nominated for an Academy Award in the category Best Sound Mixing for the film The King's Speech. He has worked on nearly 90 films and television shows since his start in 1990.

Selected filmography
 Atonement (2007)
 The King's Speech (2010)

References

External links

Year of birth missing (living people)
Living people
Place of birth missing (living people)
Emmy Award winners